Edward David Finnigan (May 23, 1913 – July 14, 1997) was a Canadian ice hockey left winger. In a career that lasted from 1930 to 1947 he played 15 games over two seasons in the National Hockey League with the St. Louis Eagles and Boston Bruins between 1934 and 1936, but primarily played as an amateur. Outside of the NHL he had a distinguished career, playing in one Memorial Cup final and four Allan Cup finals. His brother, Frank Finnigan, also played in the NHL. Their son Edward finnigan is still alive

Playing career
Finnigan was born in Shawville, Quebec. He played junior hockey with North Bay Trappers, Ottawa Shamrocks and Ottawa Rideaus from 1927 until 1931. He was a member of the Ottawa Rideaus Memorial Cup finalists team in 1929–30. He moved up to the senior Ottawa Rideaus team in 1931-32, playing in the Allan Cup finals. He played with the Rideaus through the 1933–34 season, going to the Allan Cup in 1932–33 and 1933–34. He joined the Ottawa Senators and in 1934–35 he became property of the Boston Bruins and played three games for the Bruins in 1935–36, and the bulk of the season for their CAHL affiliate Boston Cubs. He returned to Ottawa after the season and did not report to the Providence Reds the following season and was suspended. He played for the Senators in 1937–38, and after another year off due to suspension of his amateur status, played for various amateur teams until 1946–47. He made it to the Allan Cup finals again in 1940–41 with the Hull Volants of the Ottawa City Senior Hockey League.

Career statistics

Regular season and playoffs

References

External links

1913 births
1997 deaths
Boston Bruins players
Boston Cubs players
Canadian ice hockey left wingers
People from Outaouais
Providence Reds players
Rochester Cardinals players
St. Louis Eagles players
Canadian expatriate ice hockey players in the United States